Alfred Edward 'Topsy' Waldron (26 February 1857 – 7 June 1929) was an Australian rules footballer who played mostly for Norwood in the South Australian Football Association (SAFA) during the 19th century. He also played two first-class cricket matches for South Australia.

Early life 
Waldron's nickname 'Topsy' was used by his brother and stayed with him throughout his football career.

Albert-Park (1875) 
He started his career at Albert-park, playing most of that season in the Second Twenty before being chosen for a match against Melbourne.

Carlton Imperial (1876) 
In 1876, Waldron played a season with Carlton Imperial.

Carlton (1877–1878) 
When Carlton Imperial folded, he crossed to Carlton in the newly formed Victorian Football Association (VFA), playing in their 1877 VFA premiership side.

At the end of 1878, Waldron was convinced by a friend to go to Norwood, and he joined them for their second season in the SAFA.

Norwood (1879–1892, 1896, 1898) 
In 1888, Waldron captained Norwood to victory in the inaugural Championship of Australia. The club took on South Melbourne at Kensington Oval for the title and won the series 3–0. He also captained South Australia in three inter-colonial games and played in six games in all.

Waldron was captain of Norwood for a club record ten seasons, and played in nine of their early premiership teams, six as captain.

Records 
His career total of ten premierships is a record for elite Australian rules football, equal with David "Dolly" Christy: given the nature of the modern game, this record is highly unlikely to ever be broken. 

Waldron was also the first player in elite Australian rules football to play 200 games, achieving this feat in 1890, while his 197 games for Norwood remained a club record until it was broken in 1957 by Douglas Olds.

Cricket 
His two first-class cricket matches were played almost five years apart, in 1881/82 and 1887/88. Waldron failed with the bat in both but took 3 for 18 against Victoria at the Adelaide Oval in what was the only innings he bowled in. One of those wickets was Test cricketer Tup Scott.

Honours 
When the South Australian Football Hall of Fame was opened to inductees in 2002, Waldron was one of the first added, and the oldest.

References

External links

Cricinfo: Alfred Waldron

1857 births
1929 deaths
Australian rules footballers from Victoria (Australia)
Norwood Football Club players
South Australian Football Hall of Fame inductees
Australian cricketers
South Australia cricketers
Cricketers from Victoria (Australia)
People from Mornington, Victoria